Jefferson Gabriel Orejuela Izquierdo (born 14 February 1993) is an Ecuadorian professional footballer who plays as a central midfielder.

Career statistics
(Correct .)

Honours
LDU Quito
Ecuadorian Serie A: 2018

References

External links
Jefferson Orejuela profile at Federación Ecuatoriana de Fútbol 

1993 births
Living people
People from Esmeraldas Province
Ecuadorian footballers
Association football midfielders
C.S.D. Independiente del Valle footballers
Fluminense FC players
L.D.U. Quito footballers
Querétaro F.C. footballers
Barcelona S.C. footballers
Campeonato Brasileiro Série A players
Ecuadorian Serie A players
Liga MX players
Ecuador international footballers
Ecuadorian expatriate footballers
2019 Copa América players
Expatriate footballers in Brazil
Expatriate footballers in Mexico
Ecuadorian expatriate sportspeople in Brazil
Ecuadorian expatriate sportspeople in Mexico
C.S. Norte América footballers